Craryville is a hamlet located within the town of Copake in Columbia County, New York, United States. The hamlet is named after the hotelier Peter Crary, who purchased the town's hotel in 1870. Its ZIP code is 12521.

Education
The Taconic Hills Central School District operates the following schools in Craryville:
 Taconic Hills High School
 Taconic Hills Middle School
 Taconic Hills Elementary School

Notable person
 Harold Syrett (1913-1984), President of Brooklyn College

See also
Craryville (NYCRR station)

References

External links
Taconic Hills Central School District

Hamlets in Columbia County, New York
Hamlets in New York (state)